The following radio stations broadcast on FM frequency 94.1 MHz:

Argentina
 LRM730 Sendas de vida in Gálvez, Santa Fe
 LRS312 in San Carlos Centro, Santa Fe
 Milenium Rosario in Rosario, Santa Fe
 Radio María in Pampa del Indio, Chaco
 Radio María in Morteros, Córdoba
 Radio María in Concepción del Uruguay, Entre Ríos

Australia
 2IAM in Coffs Harbour, New South Wales
 Ninefourone FM in South Coast, New South Wales
 Today's Country 94one in Gosford, New South Wales
 Radio National in Launceston, Tasmania
 3WBC in Melbourne, Victoria
 ABC Western Victoria in Hamilton, Victoria
 Triple J in Bunbury, Western Australia

Belize
Faith FM

Canada (Channel 231)
 CBK-1-FM in Saskatoon, Saskatchewan
 CBKJ-FM in Pinehouse Lake, Saskatchewan
 CBL-FM in Toronto, Ontario
 CBNV-FM in Placentia, Newfoundland and Labrador
 CBYK-FM in Kamloops, British Columbia
 CBYR-FM in Rock Creek, British Columbia
 CFGW-FM in Yorkton, Saskatchewan
 CHOX-FM-1 in Baie St-Paul, Quebec
 CHSJ-FM in Saint John, New Brunswick
 CIAM-FM-3 in Watt Mountain, Alberta
 CICU-FM in Eskasoni, Nova Scotia
 CIMG-FM in Swift Current, Saskatchewan
 CJAQ-FM-1 in Banff, Alberta
 CJIK-FM in Sheshatshiu, Newfoundland and Labrador
 CJOC-FM in Lethbridge, Alberta
 CJUV-FM in Lacombe, Alberta
 CJVA in Caraquet, New Brunswick (CJVA moved from 810 AM)
 CKBA-FM in Athabasca, Alberta
 CKCN-FM in Sept-Iles, Quebec
 CKCV-FM in Creston, British Columbia
 CKEC-FM in New Glasgow, Nova Scotia
 CKNR-FM in Elliot Lake, Ontario
 CKZM-FM in St. Thomas, Ontario
 VF2288 in Hagensborg, British Columbia
 VF2289 in Carol Lake Mining, Newfoundland and Labrador
 VF2399 in Masset, British Columbia
 VF2434 in Aupaluk, Quebec
 VF2435 in Quaqtaq, Quebec
 VF2436 in Kangiqsujuaq, Quebec
 VF2437 in Kangirsuk, Quebec
 VF2438 in Kuujjuarapik, Quebec
 VF2439 in Kuujjuaq, Quebec
 VF2440 in Umiujaq, Quebec
 VF2441 in Inukjuak, Quebec
 VF2442 in Puvirgnituk, Quebec
 VF2443 in Kangiqsualujjuaq, Quebec
 VF2444 in Tasiujaq, Quebec
 VF2445 in Akulivik, Quebec
 VF2446 in Salluit, Quebec
 VF2447 in Ivujivik, Quebec
 VF2475 in Fraser Lake, British Columbia
 VF2532 in Hope, British Columbia
 VF8010 in La Tuque, Quebec

China 
 CNR Business Radio in Guilin
 CNR China Traffic Radio in Jinan
 CNR Music Radio in Tengchong
 CNR The Voice of China in Shanwei

Guatemala (Channel 16)
"La Marca 94 FM" at Guatemala City

Japan
 Tochigi Broadcasting in Tochigi

Mexico
XET-FM in Monterrey, Nuevo León
XHEDO-FM in Puerto Escondido, Oaxaca
XHEMOS-FM in Los Mochis, Sinaloa
XHFCSM-FM in Cuernavaca, Morelos
XHGNB-FM in Guerrero Negro, Baja California Sur
XHGT-FM in Zamora, Michoacán
XHHES-FM in Chihuahua, Chihuahua
XHHGR-FM in Villahermosa, Tabasco
XHHV-FM in Boca del Río, Veracruz
XHIND-FM in Tlanchinol, Hidalgo
XHJE-FM in Puebla, Puebla
XHPEBV-FM in Comitán de Dominguez, Chiapas
XHPECJ-FM in Tulancingo, Hidalgo
XHPNAS-FM in Navolato, Sinaloa
XHPSFC-FM in Campeche, Campeche
XHRASA-FM in San Luis Potosí, San Luis Potosí
XHTLN-FM in Nuevo Laredo, Tamaulipas
XHTRO-FM in Santa María Asunción Tlaxiaco, Oaxaca
XHUAD-FM in Durango, Durango
XHUAM-FM in Mexico City

Nigeria
 Wazobia FM 94.1 in Port Harcourt, Rivers State

United States (Channel 231)
 KACD-LP in Midland, Texas
 KBIH-LP in Houston, Texas
 KBJZ-LP in Juneau, Alaska
  in Merced, California
  in Caldwell, Idaho
  in Clarkston, Washington
 KCTB-LP in Lonepine, Montana
 KDJJ in Fernley, Nevada
 KDLK-FM in Del Rio, Texas
  in Downs, Kansas
 KEGR-LP in Wasilla, Alaska
 KEMB-LP in Emmetsburg, Iowa
 KEZZ in Phippsburg, Colorado
  in Kansas City, Kansas
  in Little Falls, Minnesota
 KGOD-LP in Tenaha, Texas
 KHRA-LP in Anchorage, Alaska
 KIDC-LP in Odessa, Texas
 KIND-LP in Oxnard, California
  in Bakersfield, California
 KJAZ in Point Comfort, Texas
 KJDB-LP in Sierra Vista, Arizona
  in Atwater, Minnesota
  in Little Rock, Arkansas
  in Montrose, Colorado
 KLGE in Hydesville, California
  in Morro Bay, California
 KLNO in Fort Worth, Texas
  in Brenham, Texas
  in Henderson, Nevada
  in Amarillo, Texas
 KMYI in San Diego, California
 KNBS in Bowling Green, Missouri
 KNCO-FM in Grass Valley, California
 KNEB-FM in Scottsbluff, Nebraska
 KOAU-LP in Round Rock, Texas
  in Salt Lake City, Utah
  in Myrtle Point, Oregon
 KOPR in Butte, Montana
 KOYS-LP in Bellingham, Washington
 KPFA in Berkeley, California
  in Omaha, Nebraska
  in Beaumont, Texas
  in Globe, Arizona
  in Billings, Montana
  in Hodge, Louisiana
  in Iowa City, Iowa
  in Aberdeen, South Dakota
 KSVB-LP in Big Bear City, California
 KSWD (FM) in Seattle, Washington
 KTFM in Floresville, Texas
 KTHM in Waynoka, Oklahoma
 KTRF-FM in Red Lake Falls, Minnesota
 KTRG in Hooks, Texas
 KVVO-LP in Abilene, Texas
  in Bend, Oregon
  in Eagle Lake, Minnesota
 KXOJ-FM in Glenpool, Oklahoma
 KYJJ in Boardman, Oregon
  in Lawton, Oklahoma
  in Hobbs, New Mexico
  in Albuquerque, New Mexico
  in Crawfordville, Florida
 WAXS in Oak Hill, West Virginia
 WEMX in Kentwood, Louisiana
  in Smyrna, Tennessee
 WFNU-LP in St. Paul, Minnesota
  in Franklin, New Hampshire
 WGFA-FM in Watseka, Illinois
 WGFJ in Cross Hill, South Carolina
 WGRN-LP in Columbus, Ohio
  in Canton, Ohio
  in Providence, Rhode Island
  in Gurley, Alabama
 WHST in Piegon, Michigan
 WIAL in Elk Mound, Wisconsin
 WIHR-LP in Jamestown, New York
 WIP-FM in Philadelphia, Pennsylvania
 WJHH-LP in Rice, Virginia
  in Watertown, Wisconsin
 WLFP in Germantown, Tennessee
  in Lakeland, Florida
  in Glasgow, Kentucky
  in Paris, Tennessee
 WLZT in Worthington, Indiana
  in Pensacola, Florida
 WMIX-FM in Mount Vernon, Illinois
 WMTN-LP in Sewanee, Tennessee
  in Morristown, Tennessee
  in Oriental, North Carolina
 WNNF in Cincinnati, Ohio
  in Mayaguez, Puerto Rico
  in Whitehall, New York
 WOTT in Calcium, New York
 WQBT in Savannah, Georgia
  in Sunbury, Pennsylvania
  in Keyser, West Virginia
 WRNP in Roanoke, Indiana
 WRZE in Kingstree, South Carolina
  in Fruit Cove, Florida
 WSTR (FM) in Smyrna, Georgia
 WTPS-LP in Napoleon, Ohio
  in Marianna, Florida
  in Marquette, Michigan
 WVSP-FM in Yorktown, Virginia
 WWDK in Jackson, Michigan
  in Hart, Michigan
  in Lexington, North Carolina
 WWOX in Milan, New Hampshire
 WXBJ-LP in Salisbury, Massachusetts
 WYAD-LP in Yazoo City, Mississippi
  in Carrollton, Alabama
 WZNE in Brighton, New York

Venezuela
 FM Center in Caracas, CD

References

Lists of radio stations by frequency